Ellen Wolf Schrecker (born August 4, 1938) is an American professor emerita of American history at Yeshiva University. She has received the Frederick Ewen Academic Freedom Fellowship at the Tamiment Library at NYU.  She is known primarily for her work in the history of McCarthyism.  Historian Ronald Radosh has described her as "the dean of the anti-anti-Communist historians."

Background

Schrecker graduated magna cum laude from Radcliffe College in 1960 and earned her M.A. in 1962 and her doctorate in 1974, both from Harvard University.

Career

She has taught at Harvard, Princeton, New York University, the New School for Social Research, and Columbia. From 1998 to 2002, Schrecker was the editor of Academe, the journal of the American Association of University Professors.

Personal life
Schrecker married Marvin Gettleman (1933 – 2017), a professor emeritus of history.

Political views

Schrecker has said that she is "a card-carrying member of the American Civil Liberties Union who undertook the study of McCarthyism precisely because of my opposition to its depredations against freedom of speech," and that "in this country[,] McCarthyism did more damage to the constitution than the American Communist party ever did."  Critics have argued that, in making her case, Schrecker has underplayed the undemocratic nature of the Communist Party USA.  In a reply to an essay that Schrecker and Maurice Isserman wrote in The Nation in 2000, John Earl Haynes quoted the leader of the UDA, the predecessor of the politically progressive ADA, who stated that "an alliance between liberals and Communists [would] betray liberalism's bedrock democratic values." Characterizing himself as neither "left" nor "right" but anti-"tyranny", Haynes cited as evidence of Schrecker's illiberalism her statement that "cold war liberalism did not, in fact, 'get it right.'"  Schrecker has been criticized by Trotskyites for being excessively concerned for the reputations of persons connected with the Stalin-supporting Communist Party USA, noting that the CPUSA supported the US government's prosecution of Trotskyites under the Smith Act and, in general, persecuted socialists who did not support Stalin's regime.

Schrecker has written critically of David Horowitz's "academic bill of rights" manifesto against what he considers a predominant liberal bias in American higher education. She concurred with the ACLU and Amnesty International, the Center for Constitutional Rights, and the American Association of University Professors in condemning the University of South Florida's 2003 dismissal of a tenured faculty member: the Palestinian-born,  professor of computer engineering  Sami Al-Arian, following his federal indictment during the Bush presidency on charges of raising money for terrorism through his support for Palestinian causes. Schrecker wrote:

Just as charges of communist sympathies in the 1950s destroyed the careers of people who studied China, so today the Arab-Israeli conflict plagues scholars who come from or study the Middle East. Predictably, the first major academic-freedom case to arise after September 11 involved a Palestinian nationalist, the already-controversial University of South Florida professor of computer engineering Sami Al-Arian, suspended and then fired after the federal government charged him with supporting terrorism. His summary dismissal, even if the university were to revisit it in light of his recent acquittal, is a classic violation of academic freedom: It involved his off-campus political activities.On March 2, 2006, Al-Arian, who had been kept in solitary confinement for three years while awaiting trial, accepted a plea agreement with prosecutors. He agreed to plead guilty to one count (that of misleading a reporter by shielding some of his acquaintances) out  53 counts of conspiring to help the Palestinian Islamic Jihad association, a charity founded by a former colleague of his, which in 1995 had been declared (in an executive order by President Clinton), a "specially designated terrorist" organization. Al-Arian was sentenced to 57 months in prison and ordered deported following his prison term. See Laughlin, "In His Plea Deal, What Did Sami Al-Arian Admit to?", Tampa Bay Times, April 4, 2006.

Bibliography

Schrecker's best known book is Many Are the Crimes: McCarthyism in America (1998), about which Kirkus Reviews wrote, "It is no easy task bringing new life to an era already as dissected as the McCarthy era, yet this is what Schrecker accomplishes in a magnificent study of how and why McCarthyism happened and how its shadow still darkens our lives." In addition, she has written on political repression, academic freedom, Soviet espionage during the Cold War, Franco-American relations in the 1920s ( subject of her PhD dissertation), and Chinese cuisine.

Books

Articles, chapters
with Maurice Isserman, "'Papers of a Dangerous Tendency':  From Major Andre's Boot to the Venona Files," in Schrecker, ed., Cold War Triumphalism

"McCarthyism: Political Repression and the Fear of Communism," Social Research Vol. 71, No 3 (Fall 2004)
"Stealing Secrets: Communism and Soviet Espionage in the 1940s, " North Carolina Law Review vol 82, #5 (June 2004): 101–47.
"Communism and Soviet Espionage in the 1940s," North Carolina Law Review, vol 82, #5 (June 2004)

"Soviet Espionage on American TV: The VENONA Story," Diplomatic History, Vol 27, no. 2 (Spring 2003), 279–82.

"Free Speech on Campus: Academic Freedom and the Corporations," in Thomas R.  Hensley, ed., The Boundaries of Freedom of Expression and Order in American Democracy, Kent State University Press, spring 2001

with Maurice Isserman, "The Right's Cold War Revisionism," The Nation, July 24/31, 2000
"Left, Right, and Labor," Working USA (Jan-Feb 2000)
"McCarthy's Ghosts: Anticommunism and American Labor," New Labor Forum, Spring/Summer, 1999
"The Spies Who Loved Us," The Nation (May 24, 1999)
"Will Technology Make Academic Freedom Obsolete?" in Will Teach for Food: Academic Labor in Crisis, Cary Nelson, ed. University of Minnesota Press, 1997
"Immigration and Internal Security: Political Deportations during the McCarthy Era," Science & Society 60 (4) Winter 1996-1997
"Before the Rosenbergs: Espionage Scenarios in the Early Cold War" in Marjorie Garber and Rebecca Walkowitz, ed., Secret Agents: The Rosenberg Case and the McCarthy Era, Routledge (1995)
"McCarthyism and the Communist Party," in Michael Brown et al. eds., New Studies in the Politics and Culture of U.S. Communism, Monthly Review Press, New York,  1993; reprinted in Andre Kaenel, ed., Anti-Communism and McCarthyism in the United States, Editions Messene, Paris, 1995
"McCarthyism and the Labor Movement: The Role of the State," in Steve Rosswurm, ed., The CIO's Left‑Led Unions, Rutgers University Press, New Brunswick, NJ, 1992
"Introduction" to Records of the Subversive Activities Control Board, 1950‑1972, University Publications of America, Frederick, MD, 1989
"Archival Sources for the Study of McCarthyism," Journal of American History, June 1988
book and film reviews in American Historical Review, Diplomatic History, History of Education Quarterly, Isis, Journal of American History, Labor History, Labour/Le Travail, Monthly Review, The Nation, Pacific Historical Review, Political Science Quarterly, Science and Society, Women's Review of Books, Journal of Cold War Studies, H-Net

See also

 Marvin Gettleman
 McCarthyism

Notes

External links
 Ellen Schrecker's Curriculum Vitae
with Ellen Schrecker  by Stephen McKiernan, Binghamton University Libraries Center for the Study of the 1960s, May 19, 2011
 

Jewish American historians
Historians of the United States
Cold War historians
Radcliffe College alumni
Yeshiva University faculty
1938 births
McCarthyism
Living people
21st-century American historians
American women historians
21st-century American women
21st-century American Jews